Morehouse is a town in Hamilton County, New York, United States. The population was 86 at the 2010 census. The name is that of an early developer, Andrew K. Morehouse.

The town is in the Adirondack Park. It is in the southwestern corner of the county and is northeast of Utica.

History 
Morehouse was formed from part of the town of Lake Pleasant in 1835. Morehouse ("Morehouseville") was created by land developer and entrepreneur Andrew King Morehouse (1805-1884); the post office there opened on April 9, 1834. (Morehouse owned  of wilderness in Hamilton, Herkimer and Saratoga counties, but ultimately ended up dying in a poorhouse.) Part of the town was later taken and added to the town of Long Lake. An additional part of Morehouse was taken for Long Lake in 1861. In 1901, the town of Inlet was formed from the northern end of Morehouse.

The town is notable for many failed attempts to develop it economically. Ultimately, those parts of the original town only became important after separation from Morehouse.

One of the most newsworthy events to occur in town was the crash landing of an American Airways Curtis Condor in December 1934 and daring rescue of the crew by locals on snowshoes in the southern end of town.

Geography

The western and southern town lines of Morehouse are the border of Herkimer County.

The West Canada Creek flows out the western town line, and other tributaries of that stream flow through the town. The Moose River marks the northern town line.

New York State Route 8, an east–west highway in the southern part of the town, is the only significant road in Morehouse, passing through the hamlets of Morehouseville and Hoffmeister.

Demographics

As of the census of 2000, there were 151 people, 65 households, and 46 families residing in the town. The population density was 0.8 people per square mile (0.3/km2). There were 293 housing units at an average density of 1.5 per square mile (0.6/km2). The racial makeup of the town was 97.35% White, 1.32% Native American, 1.32% from other races. Hispanic or Latino of any race were 1.32% of the population.

There were 65 households, out of which 18.5% had children under the age of 18 living with them, 66.2% were married couples living together, 3.1% had a female householder with no husband present, and 27.7% were non-families. 20.0% of all households were made up of individuals, and 6.2% had someone living alone who was 65 years of age or older. The average household size was 2.32 and the average family size was 2.57.

In the town, the population was spread out, with 17.9% under the age of 18, 2.0% from 18 to 24, 23.2% from 25 to 44, 37.1% from 45 to 64, and 19.9% who were 65 years of age or older. The median age was 50 years. For every 100 females, there were 125.4 males. For every 100 females age 18 and over, there were 129.6 males.

The median income for a household in the town was $25,417, and the median income for a family was $27,500. Males had a median income of $21,750 versus $15,000 for females. The per capita income for the town was $12,864. There were 4.2% of families and 7.3% of the population living below the poverty line, including no under eighteens and 6.3% of those over 64.

Communities and locations in Morehouse

Communities 

 Hoffmeister – A hamlet on NY-8 east of Morehouse, named after an early settler. This community is little more than a thin scattering of houses.
 Morehouseville – A hamlet, also called "Morehouse" and previously known as "Bethunville," is on NY-8, east of the county line. This is the principal community in the town.
 Mountain Home – A location north of Hoffmeister, on Mountain Home Road.

Geographical features 
 Beaver Lake – A lake by the northern town line. 
 Bochen Lake – A lake located south of Morehouseville.
 The Floe – An artificial lake between Mountain Home and Hoffmeister, on the South Branch of West Canada Creek.
 Fort Noble Mountain – An elevation at the western town line, northwest of Morehouseville.
 Indian Lake – A Lake in the northern part of Morehouse, south of Squaw Lake.
 Jerseyfield Lake – A lake at the southern town line.
 Metcalf Lake – A lake located northeast of Hoffmeister.
 Moose River – A river marking the northern town line.
 Morehouse Lake  – A small lake south of Morehouse Mountain.
 Morehouse Mountain – A mountain near the eastern town line, south of NY-8.
 Pine Lake – A lake by the eastern town line, northeast of Hoffmeister.
 Squaw Lake – A lake in the northern part of the town, south of Beaver Lake.
 South Branch West Canada Creek – A small river flowing west, to the north of NY-8.
 West Creek Lake – A lake located east of Jerseyfield Lake.
 Wilmurt Lake – A lake north of NY-8.

References

External links
 Early history sources of Morehouse

Towns in Hamilton County, New York